was a company that built and operated railways in Kyushu, one of four main islands of Japan. Most of its lines came under the control of Japanese Government Railways following nationalization in 1907, and many are now operated by Kyushu Railway Company.

History
The company was incorporated on August 15, 1888 in Fukuoka, Fukuoka.
The first  of the railway, between Hakata Station in Fukuoka and Chitosegawa temporary station in Asahi, Saga (near Kurume, Fukuoka), opened on December 11, 1889 as the first railway in Kyushu.

The company expanded the railway by means of both construction and acquisition of other companies. As of 1907, it operated  of railways in Fukuoka, Kumamoto, Nagasaki, Ōita and Saga prefectures in northern Kyushu.

On July 1, 1907, the entire operation of the company was purchased by the government of Japan under the Railway Nationalization Act. Consequently, the company was dissolved.

List of lines

Rolling stock

A special coach made by German car manufacturer van der Zypen & Charlier was imported by Kyushu Railway for VIP use in 1891. The coach was improved and designated as the imperial coach in 1902 for use by Emperor Meiji when he visited an army drill in Kumamoto Prefecture. After the nationalization, the coach was called the imperial coach No. 2 but was not used again by the emperor.

Kyushu Railway History Museum 

The Kyushu Railway History Museum was established near Mojikō Station in Kitakyūshū in 2003. The red-brick main building of the museum is the former headquarters of Kyushu Railway.

References

External links

 Kyushu Railway History Museum website 

Defunct railway companies of Japan
Railway companies established in 1888
Railway companies disestablished in 1907
Kyushu region